Buddhist temples are an important part of the Korean landscape.  This article gives a brief overview of Korean Buddhism, then describes some of the more important temples in Korea. Most Korean temples have names ending in -sa (사, 寺), which means "temple" in Sino-Korean.

Many temples, like Sudeoksa, offer visitors a Temple Stay program.

Background

A distinctive form of Buddhism evolved in Korea. This was facilitated by the geographical location and cultural conditions. Buddhism first arrived in Korea in 372 in Goguryeo. In 374 the influential Han Chinese monk Ado arrived in the kingdom and inspired King Sosurim of Goguryeo the following year. The first two temples Seongmunsa and Ilbullansa were built in 375 on the order of the king. Buddhism soon became the national religion of Goguryeo.

With the advent of Taoism in 624 the rulers began to suppress Buddhism and its importance quickly declined. The Baekje Kingdom, on the other hand, flourished under the influence of Buddhism. In 552 Buddhist scriptures were sent to Japan. This eventually led to the establishment of Buddhism in Japan.

In Silla, Buddhism was important, too. It flourished during the reign of Jinheung of Silla (540 to 576). Heungnyunsa was built, where any commoner could become a monk. The study of scriptures was greatly highlighted. For about 250 years Buddhism thrived in Later Silla.

Buddhism was admired by Wang Geon, who was enthroned as Taejo of Goryeo. Throughout the country pagodas and other Buddhist structures were built.

In late Goryeo, Buddhism became linked with corruption of the regime. A great number of monks were involved in politics. Bit by bit anti-Buddhist sentiments grew, leading to chaos which was ended by the establishment of Joseon. Taejo of Joseon himself was a devout Buddhist, but the influence of monks was reduced. At times monks were treated as outcasts, but generally there was no hindrance to their practising. Buddhist heritage can be found all over the country in the form of temples, pagodas, sculptures, paintings, handicrafts and buildings.

Typical Layout
A typical Korean temple consists of the following elements:
Iljumun (일주문, 一柱門) - One pillar gate found at the entrance to temple grounds
Sacheonwangmun (사천왕문, 四天王門), also Cheonwangmun - Gate of the Four Heavenly Kings, to mark the entrance of the temple's boundaries
Beopdang (법당, 法堂) - Dharma hall, used for lectures and sermons
Monastic quarters
Jonggo (종고, 鐘鼓) - bell tower
Daeungjeon (대웅전, 大雄殿) - main shrine hall housing the temple's main Buddha images
Pagoda
Myeongbujeon (명부전, 冥府殿) - judgment hall, housing an image of the bodhisattva Kshitigarbha (지장, 地藏) and depictions of the Buddhist hell
Nahanjeon (나한전, 羅漢殿) - Hall of the Arhats
Sansingak (산신각, 山神閣) - a shamanic shrine dedicated to the mountain god Sansin (산신, 山神), who can be depicted as both a male or a female. Sometimes called chilseong-gak (칠성각, 七星閣) or samseong-gak (삼성각, 三星閣), this shrine is usually found behind the main shrine hall.
Hermitage

North Korea
It is reported that many temples have been taken over by the state. Once the government controls these buildings, they are used mainly as museums of ancient Korean traditions. A few temples are still in use and they are considered National Treasures. Though few temples in large cities survived the US carpet bombings of the Korean War, many still survive in rural areas, and some of the more famous, large temples destroyed have since been rebuilt (such as the Ryongtongsa and Singyesa). All in all, there are 300 temples, but only in a few are religious services permitted.  In the list  that follows, temples marked with a "×" were destroyed during the Korean War or no longer exist for other reasons; temples marked with an "*" have been rebuilt.

South Korea

There are about 900 traditional Buddhist temples in South Korea, out of about 20,000 Buddhist temples in total.

Notable temples in both Koreas

 

The following list is sorted by Romanized names, but it also can be sorted by Korean names, by provinces (SK=South Korea, NK=North Korea), or by counties (i.e. gun or si). 
Some Korean names, and founding dates are to be completed (the founding date applies to the location, even if none of the original structures survive).
A star in the first column denotes the 31 head temples designated during the Japanese colonial period. Recommended policy: no new entries, except from temples having their own English page in Wikipedia.

See also
List of Buddhist temples (worldwide)
List of Buddhist temples in Seoul provides a list of 55 temples.
Temple Stay
Three Jewel Temples of Korea
Tripiṭaka Koreana
Korean temple cuisine

References

 
 
 
National Treasures of North Korea
National Treasures of South Korea
Korean culture
Lists of Buddhist buildings and structures